Mamadou Sène (born 20 June 1960) is a Senegalese sprinter. He competed in the men's 4 × 100 metres relay at the 1984 Summer Olympics.

References

1960 births
Living people
Athletes (track and field) at the 1984 Summer Olympics
Senegalese male sprinters
Olympic athletes of Senegal
Place of birth missing (living people)